The Municipal Annexe, 68 Dale Street, Liverpool is next to the Municipal Buildings, Liverpool, the former administrative headquarters of Liverpool City Council.

History
It was built in 1883 to a design by F & G Holme as the base for the Conservative Club. 
It was later acquired by the City Council and housed the education department but was sold in the late 1990s. It was intended that the building would be linked with two other properties on St Thomas Street and turned into Liverpool's first 5-star hotel, known as the Layla. Initially planned for opening in 2006, the project was delayed and the investors, Illiad, sold their shares in the development to a Dubai based consortium in July 2012. 
The new 87-room hotel opened in October 2015 branded as a DoubleTree by Hilton.

Architecture
The building is three storeys tall with a basement and an attic and is built from stone with a slate mansard roof. The exterior is partially surrounded with balustrades and there is a balcony on the first floor of the building.

See also

 Liverpool Town Hall
 Municipal Buildings

References

External links
The staircase of the Municipal Annexe (1883)
Building details at Historic England

Grade II listed buildings in Liverpool
Liverpool City Council
Grade II listed hotels